Heathfield School is a girls' independent boarding and day school in Ascot, Berkshire, England. In 2006, the school absorbed St Mary's School, Wantage and was briefly named Heathfield St Mary's School but reverted to Heathfield School in 2009 to prevent confusion with another local girls' school St Mary's School, Ascot. The school's grounds cover  situated on the edge of Ascot (actually in Bracknell Forest), providing access from London, the major airports, the M3 and M4 motorways.

History

Heathfield Ascot
The school stands in 36 acres of grounds on the outskirts of Ascot and has done so since Heathfield School was founded in 1899 by Eleanor Beatrice Wyatt, its first headmistress. In 1882, at the age of 24, Miss Wyatt and her mother had opened Queen's Gate School in South Kensington, London.

Until this point Miss Wyatt had been concentrating on educating boys and girls from the lower-middle and lower classes; however, she was convinced that the best way to further education for all was to educate those who could in turn educate others. This coincided with Miss Wyatt's desire to move out of a congested and claustrophobic London. The problem she faced was that, while wishing to move to a more spacious country location, she still wanted to maintain a proximity to London and the school's active Old Girl network. In 1899 the solution was found in Ascot, Berkshire, and Heathfield School was founded in a beautiful Italianate building, the original home of the Paravacini family. On 8 May, the school was officially opened and the Chapel blessed.

St Mary's Wantage

The Reverend William John Butler became Vicar of Wantage on 1 January 1847. His main aims were, first, to revive the religious life in England and second, to improve education. He hoped to achieve these aims by setting up an order of teaching sisters, but he faced many disappointments and spent 25 years trying to improve various day schools in the parish before St Mary's School was founded in 1873. 

The school was run by the sisters of the Community of St Mary the Virgin and was based in the Queen Anne house on Newbury Street. Sister Ellen was the first Sister-in-Charge and Sister Juliana succeeded her in 1887. Sister Juliana had studied at Cambridge and set a high standard for the girls, entering them for the Oxford and Cambridge local examinations.

Sister Annie Louisa joined the school in 1898 and started a guide movement called Scout Patrols in 1899 before Boy Scouts had even begun. She succeeded Sister Juliana as Headmistress in 1903. Sister Annie Louisa was responsible for the chief structural improvements at St Mary's including a science wing and the conversion of an old barn into a gymnasium. By the time Sister Annie Louisa left in 1919, St Mary's was recognised as a "public school with an unusually high standard of scholarship".

Facilities
The school is equipped with teaching, sporting and leisure facilities.  Following the merger of Heathfield School and St Mary's Wantage in 2006, a development plan was launched which delivered new facilities.  Phase one of redevelopment, the enlargement of the main Library, and phase two, a new Cookery building and Performing Arts Centre, were completed in 2009.  The Performing Arts Centre was officially opened in December 2009 as the St Mary's Theatre.

In the summer of 2014, work started on a new STEM (Science, Technology, Engineering & Mathematics) building, providing a hub for the girls to study science subjects. At the same time, the Spectrum (Learning Support and English as a Foreign Language) facility was moved and greatly expanded into four smart new classrooms and a meeting area.  At the beginning of Michaelmas term 2015, the STEM building was completed and teaching in the new classrooms commenced.  The eight classrooms comprise four Science Labs, two Maths classrooms, Psychology and PE classrooms.  There is also a Science Prep room for the preparation of experiments.  All classrooms are equipped with interactive SMARTboards, the four Labs receiving 65" HD touch displays.

The school focuses on keeping the class sizes small which helps to focus on individual learning.

Academic
The 2018 ISI Inspection report noted that "The quality of pupils' academic and other achievements is excellent" and commended the pupils' enthusiastic committed approach to their learning. It also found the quality of the pupils' personal development excellent.  "The overall achievement of the pupils is excellent and represents the successful fulfilment of the school's ambitious aims."

Houses
All girls are placed in one of the four houses upon entry. A Head of House looks after the girls and is the first point of contact for parents and girls on issues.

Boarding
The boarding houses are separate from the house system. Instead, boarders are grouped into dormitories and boarding houses by years. A housemistress for each year and full-time residential staff reside on campus. Girls in Sixth Form live in separate accommodation similar to that of a hall of residence to prepare them for university life. Having been one of the few remaining full boarding school for girls in the country, Heathfield School started accepting day girls who resided locally from the 2015–16 academic year onwards.

Notable former pupils

Alexandra Hamilton, Duchess of Abercorn
Eileen Agar, surrealist artist
Alexandra, Queen Consort of Yugoslavia
Isabella Anstruther-Gough-Calthorpe, model and socialite
Marisa Berenson, actress
Isabella Blow, fashion editor
Harriet Bridgeman, Viscountess Bridgeman, founder of Bridgeman Art Library
Nina Campbell, interior designer
Susannah Constantine, fashion advisor and author  
Davina Ingrams, 18th Baroness Darcy de Knayth
Martine Franck, photographer
Victoria Glendinning, novelist and broadcaster
Lucinda Green, three-day eventer
Daphne Guinness
Phyllis Hartnoll, poet
Judith Keppel, quiz panellist, first million-pound winner of Who wants to be a millionaire?
Amber Le Bon, daughter of Duran Duran's Simon Le Bon and supermodel Yasmin Le Bon
Tara Lee, yoga instructor
Tiggy Legge-Bourke, nanny to Princes William and Harry
Serena Armstrong-Jones, Countess of Snowdon
Candida Lycett Green, daughter of Sir John Betjeman, horsewoman and writer
Susan Cunliffe-Lister, Baroness Masham of Ilton
Tamara Mellon, CEO of Jimmy Choo
Sienna Miller, actress
Tessa Montgomery, Viscountess Montgomery of Alamein
Emma Nicholson, Baroness Nicholson of Winterbourne, politician
Princess Alexandra, The Honourable Lady Ogilvy, cousin of The Queen
Alice Orr-Ewing, actress
Flora Fraser, 21st Lady Saltoun
Lady Henrietta Spencer-Churchill, daughter of the 11th Duke of Marlborough and interior designer
Rosie Stancer (née Clayton), polar adventurer
Tara Summers, actress
Lady Helen Taylor
Susan Travers, served with the French Foreign Legion
Natalia Grosvenor, Duchess of Westminster
Dame Jane Whiteley
Judith Wilcox, Baroness Wilcox
Gabriella Wilde, actress

References

External links
 School website
 Heathfield Old Girls
 St Mary's Wantage Old Girls
 Profile on the Independent Schools Council website
 ISI Inspection Reports
 Charity Commission Report
 Profile on Good Schools Guide
 Profile on MyDaughter
 Heathfield Conference Centre

Private schools in Bracknell Forest
Boarding schools in Berkshire
Girls' schools in Berkshire
Member schools of the Girls' Schools Association
Educational institutions established in 1899
1899 establishments in England
Church of England private schools in the Diocese of Oxford
Winkfield